Mormoscopa is a genus of moths of the family Noctuidae.

Species
Mormoscopa phricozona (Turner, 1902) 
Mormoscopa sordescens (Rosenstock, 1885)

References
Natural History Museum Lepidoptera genus database

Herminiinae